Sex for Safety is The Inevitable Backlash's first studio album. It was released on March 27, 2007.

Track listing

Personnel
John Renton - guitar/vocals
Chris Stein - bass
John Renton - drums
Manny Nieto - Producer
Mark Chalecki - Mastering

Artwork
The CD cover for Sex for Safety EP is a digitally rendered watercolor sketch by Tegan and Sara art director EE Storey.

References

2007 EPs
The Inevitable Backlash albums